Dilan Ramanayake (born 15 June 1980) is a Sri Lankan former cricketer. He played in 37 first-class and 37 List A matches between 1999/00 and 2008/09. He made his Twenty20 debut on 17 August 2004, for Kurunegala Youth Cricket Club in the 2004 SLC Twenty20 Tournament.

References

External links
 

1980 births
Living people
Sri Lankan cricketers
Kurunegala Youth Cricket Club cricketers
Nondescripts Cricket Club cricketers
Singha Sports Club cricketers
Place of birth missing (living people)